Dharau is a village in Kanpur Dehat district in the state of Uttar Pradesh, India.

Demographics
As of 2001 India census	Dharau had a population of 777	Males constitute 55.98% of the population and females 44.02%.

Transport
It is well connected by rail and road.

Geography
It has an average elevation of 125 meters (413 feet).

External links
Dharau

Villages in Kanpur Dehat district